Fredrik Jensen (born 13 June 1985) is a Swedish former footballer who played the majority of his career for Trelleborgs FF as a forward. They signed him from Höörs IS in the Swedish sixth tier where he had scored 28 goals in one season.

References

External links
 

1985 births
Living people
Association football defenders
Trelleborgs FF players
Allsvenskan players
Superettan players
Swedish footballers